The Schauspielhaus Bochum is one of the notable drama theatres in Germany. It is located on Königsallee in Bochum, North Rhine-Westphalia. Eric de Vroedt is an established guest director at the theatre.

References

Theatres in North Rhine-Westphalia
1900s architecture